Anastasia is an unincorporated community in Vulcan County, Alberta, Canada that was once a small Doukhobor settlement. It may have been named after Princess Anastasia Romanov.

History 

In 1924 following the death of Peter Verigin, many Doukhobors of the Brilliant, British Columbia settlement claimed Anastasia F. Holuboff be the successor to Peter. A majority of the Doukhobors community disagreed and declared that the Verigin's son should become the new leader for the settlement. In 1926, Anastasia along with 160 of her followers broke away from the settlement to land that was bought two miles (3 km) west of the community of Shouldice, Alberta, where the new break-away communal settlement was formed.

Notable people 

 Anastasia F. Holoboff, leader of the Doukhobor commune and founder of Anastasia.

See also 

 List of communities in Alberta
 Block settlement
 Doukhobor
http://www.larrysdesk.com/alberta-ccubshouldice-archive.html

References

External links
 Anastasia's Village - Doukhobor Genealogy

 http://www.larrysdesk.com/alberta-ccubshouldice-archive.html

Doukhobors
Localities in Vulcan County
Populated places established in 1926